Stenocnemis is a genus of white-legged damselfly in the family Platycnemididae. There is one described species in Stenocnemis, S. pachystigma.

References

Platycnemididae